Lanjigarh (Sl. No.: 77) is a Vidhan Sabha constituency of Kalahandi district, Odisha.

This constituency includes Lanjigarh block, Thuamul Rampur block and 16 Gram panchayats (Anlabhata, Badakarlakot, Badpujhariaguda, Baner, Bhainripali, Dhansuli, Hirapur, Jaipatna, Kuchagaon, Mangalpur, Mukhiguda, Paikkendumundi, Pratappur, Rengalpalli, Sargiguda and Uchhula) of Jaipatna block and 8 GPs (Risigaon, Duarsuni, Sagada, Jugsaipatna, Chancher, Kuturukhamar, Malgaon and Tal Belgaon) of Bhawanipatna block.

Elected Members

Election results

2019

2014

2009

Notes

References

Assembly constituencies of Odisha
Kalahandi district